Be Still may refer to:

Albums
 Be Still (Dave Douglas album)
 Be Still (Donna Lewis album)
Be Still, by Adrian Klumpes

Songs
 "Be Still", by The Beach Boys from the album Friends
 "Be Still" (Yolanda Adams song), from the album Becoming
 "Be Still" (Kelly Clarkson song), from the album My December
 "Be Still", by The Fray from the album Scars & Stories
 "Be Still", by The Killers from the album Battle Born
 "Be Still", by Peter Gabriel from the album Peace Together

See also
Be Still (film), a 2021 Canadian drama
"Be Still for the Presence of the Lord", hymn written by David Evans
"Be Still My Beating Heart", song by Sting, from his 1987 album ...Nothing Like the Sun
"Be Still, My Soul" (hymn), a Christian hymn set to Finlandia Hymn. (Refer to separate section on song on that page)
Be Still My Soul (Abigail album)
Be Still My Soul (Selah album)
Be Still Please, album by Portastatic